Whole life insurance, or whole of life assurance (in the Commonwealth of Nations), sometimes called "straight life" or "ordinary life", is a life insurance policy which is guaranteed to remain in force for the insured's entire lifetime, provided required premiums are paid, or to the maturity date.  As a life insurance policy it represents a contract between the insured and insurer that as long as the contract terms are met, the insurer will pay the death benefit of the policy to the policy's beneficiaries when the insured dies. Because whole life policies are guaranteed to remain in force as long as the required premiums are paid, the premiums are typically much higher than those of term life insurance where the premium is fixed only for a limited term. Whole life premiums are fixed, based on the age of issue, and usually do not increase with age.  The insured party normally pays premiums until death, except for limited pay policies which may be paid up in 10 years, 20 years, or at age 65. Whole life insurance belongs to the cash value category of life insurance, which also includes universal life, variable life, and endowment policies.

Death benefit

The death benefit of a whole life policy is normally the stated face amount. However, if the policy is "participating", the death benefit will be increased by any accumulated dividend values and/or decreased by any outstanding policy loans (see example below). Certain riders, such as Accidental Death benefit may exist, which would potentially increase the benefit.

In contrast, universal life policies (a flexible premium whole life substitute) may be structured to pay cash values in addition to the face amount, but usually do not guarantee lifetime coverage in such cases.

Maturity

A whole life policy is said to "mature" at death or the maturity age of 100, whichever comes first. To be more exact the maturity date will be the "policy anniversary nearest age 100". The policy becomes a "matured endowment" when the insured person lives past the stated maturity age. In that event the policy owner receives the face amount in cash. With many modern whole life policies, issued since 2009, maturity ages have been increased to 120. Increased maturity ages have the advantage of preserving the tax-free nature of the death benefit.  In contrast, a matured endowment may have substantial tax obligations.

Taxation
The entire death benefit of a whole life policy is free of income tax, except in unusual cases. This includes any internal gains in cash values. The same is true of group life, term life, and accidental death policies.

However, when a policy is cashed out before death, the treatment varies. With cash surrenders, any gain over total premiums paid will be taxable as ordinary income. The same is true in the case of a matured endowment. This is why most people choose to take cash values out as a "loan" against the death benefit rather than a "surrender." Any money taken as a loan is free from income tax as long as the policy remains in force. For participating whole life policies, the interest charged by the insurance company for the loan is often less than the dividend each year, especially after 10–15 years, so the policy owner can pay off the loan using dividends. If the policy is surrendered or canceled before death, any loans received above the cumulative value of premiums paid will be subject to tax as growth on investment.

Although life insurance benefits are generally free of income tax, the same is not true of estate tax. In the US, life insurance will be considered part of a person's taxable estate to the extent he possesses "incidents of ownership." Estate planners often use special irrevocable trusts to shield life insurance from estate taxes.

Uses

Personal and family uses
Individuals may find whole life attractive because it offers coverage for an indeterminate length of time. It is the dominant choice for insuring so-called "permanent" insurance needs, including: 
 Funeral expenses,
 Estate planning, 
 Surviving spouse income, and
 Supplemental retirement income.

Individuals may find whole life less attractive, due to the relatively high premiums, for insuring:
 Large debts,
 Temporary needs, such as children's dependency years,
 Young families with large needs and limited income.

In the second category, term life is generally considered more suitable and has played an increasingly larger role in recent years.

Business uses
Businesses may also have legitimate and compelling needs, including funding of:

 Buy-sell agreements
 Death of key person
 Supplemental executive retirement plans (S.E.R.P.)
 Deferred compensation

While Term life may be suitable for Buy-Sell agreements and Key Person indemnification, cash value insurance is almost exclusively for Deferred Comp and S.E.R.P.'s.

Level premium

Level premium whole life insurance (sometimes called ordinary whole life, though this term is also sometimes used more broadly) provides lifetime death benefit coverage for a level premium.

Whole life premiums are much higher than term insurance premiums, but because term insurance premiums rise with increasing age of the insured, the cumulative value of all premiums paid under whole and term policies are roughly equal if the policy continues to average life expectancy. Part of the insurance contract stipulates that the policyholder is entitled to a cash value reserve that is part of the policy and guaranteed by the company. This cash value can be accessed at any time through policy loans that are received income tax-free and paid back according to mutually agreed-upon schedules. These policy loans are available until the insured's death. If any loans amounts are outstanding—i.e., not yet paid back—upon the insured's death, the insurer subtracts those amounts from the policy's face value/death benefit and pays the remainder to the policy's beneficiary.

Whole life insurance may prove a better value than term for someone with an insurance need of greater than ten to fifteen years due to favorable tax treatment of interest credited to cash values. However, for those unable to afford the premium necessary to provide adequate whole life coverage for their current insurance needs, it would be imprudent to purchase less coverage than is adequate as whole life insurance rather than purchase an adequate level of term to cover their current need.

While some life insurance companies market whole life as a "death benefit with a savings account", the distinction is artificial, according to life insurance actuaries Albert E. Easton and Timothy F. Harris. The net amount at risk is the amount the insurer must pay to the beneficiary should the insured die before the policy has accumulated premiums equal to the death benefit. It is the difference between the policy's current cash value (i.e., total paid in by owner plus that amount's interest earnings) and its face value/death benefit. Although the actual cash value may be different from the death benefit, in practice the policy is identified by its original face value/death benefit.

The advantages of whole life insurance are its guaranteed death benefits; guaranteed cash values; fixed, predictable premiums; and mortality and expense charges that do not reduce the policy's cash value. The disadvantages of whole life are the inflexibility of its premiums and the fact that the internal rate of return of the policy may not be competitive with other savings and investment alternatives.

Death benefit amounts of whole life policies can also be increased through accumulation and/or reinvestment of policy dividends, though these dividends are not guaranteed and may be higher or lower than earnings at existing interest rates over time. According to internal documents from some life insurance companies, the internal rate of return and dividend payment realized by the policyholder is often a function of when the policyholder buys the policy and how long that policy remains in force. Dividends paid on a whole life policy can be utilized in many ways.

The life insurance manual defines policy dividends as refunds of premium over-payments. They are therefore not exactly like corporate stock dividends, which are payouts of net income from total revenues.

Modified whole life insurance features smaller premiums for a specified period of time, followed by higher premiums for the remainder of the policy.
Survivorship life insurance is whole life insurance insuring two lives, with proceeds payable after the second (later) death. The level premium system results in overpaying for the risk of dying at younger ages, and underpaying in later years toward the end of life.

Reserves
The over-payments inherent in the level premium system mean that a large portion of expensive old-age costs are prepaid during a person's younger years. U.S. Life insurance companies are required by state regulation to set up reserve funds to account for said over-payments, which represent promised future benefits, and are classified as Legal Reserve Life Insurance Companies. The Death Benefit promised by the contract is a fixed obligation calculated to be payable at the end of life expectancy, which may be 50 years or more in the future. (see non-forfeiture values)

Most of the visible and apparent wealth of Life Insurance companies is due to the enormous assets (reserves) they hold to stand behind future liabilities. In fact, reserves are classified as a liability, since they represent obligations to policyholders. These reserves are primarily invested in bonds and other debt instruments, and are thus a major source of financing for government and private industry.

Cash values
Cash values are an integral part of a whole life policy, and reflect the reserves necessary to assure payment of the guaranteed death benefit. Thus, "cash surrender" (and "loan") values arise from the policyholder's rights to quit the contract and reclaim a share of the reserve fund attributable to his policy. (see #Example of non-forfeiture values below)

Although life insurance is often sold with a view toward the "living benefits" (accumulated cash and dividend values), this feature is a byproduct of the level premium nature of the contract. The original intent was not to "sugar coat" the product; rather it is a necessary part of the design. However, prospective purchasers are often more motivated by the thought of being able to "count my money in the future." Policies purchased at younger ages will usually have guaranteed cash values greater than the sum of all premiums paid after a number of years. Sales tactics frequently appeal to this self-interest (sometimes called "the greed motive"). It is a reflection of human behavior that people are often more willing to talk about money for their own future than to discuss provisions for the family in case of premature death (the "fear motive"). On the other hand, many policies purchased due to selfish motives will become vital family resources later in a time of need.

The cash values in whole life policies grow at a guaranteed rate (usually 4%) plus an annual dividend. In certain states the cash value in the policies is 100% asset protected, meaning the cash value cannot be taken away in the event of a lawsuit or bankruptcy. Also if used and built correctly the cash value can be taken out of the policy on a tax-free basis. 

When discontinuing a policy, according to Standard Non-forfeiture Law, a policyholder is entitled to receive his share of the reserves, or cash values, in one of three ways (1) cash, (2) reduced paid-up insurance, or (3) extended term insurance.

Pricing methods

Non-participating

All values related to the policy (death benefits, cash surrender values, premiums) are usually determined at policy issue, for the life of the contract, and usually cannot be altered after issue.  This means that the insurance company assumes all risk of future performance versus the actuaries' estimates. If future claims are underestimated, the insurance company makes up the difference.  On the other hand, if the actuaries' estimates on future death claims are high, the insurance company will retain the difference.

Non-participating policies are typically issued by Stock companies, with stockholder capital bearing the risk. Since whole life policies frequently cover a time span in excess of 50 years, it can be seen that accurate pricing is a formidable challenge. Actuaries must set a rate which will be sufficient to keep the company solvent through prosperity or depression, while remaining competitive in the marketplace. The company will be faced with future changes in Life expectancy, unforeseen economic conditions, and changes in the political and regulatory landscape.  All they have to guide them is past experience.

Participating

In a participating policy (also "par" in the United States, and known as a "with-profits policy" in the Commonwealth), the insurance company shares the excess profits (divisible surplus) with the policyholder in the form of annual dividends.  Typically these "refunds" are not taxable because they are considered an overcharge of premium (or "reduction of basis"). In general, the greater the overcharge by the company, the greater the refund/dividend ratio; however, other factors will also have a bearing on the size of the dividend. For a mutual life insurance company, participation also implies a degree of ownership of the mutuality.

Participating policies are typically (although not exclusively) issued by mutual life insurance companies.  However, stock companies sometimes issue participating policies.  Premiums for a participating policy will be higher than for a comparable non-par policy, with the difference (or, "overcharge") being considered as "paid-in surplus" to provide a margin for error equivalent to stockholder capital. Illustrations of future dividends are never guaranteed.

In the case of mutual companies, unneeded surplus is distributed retrospectively to policyholders in the form of dividends. Sources of surplus include conservative pricing, mortality experience more favorable than anticipated, excess interest, and savings in expenses of operation.

While the "overcharge" terminology is technically correct for tax purposes, actual dividends are often a much greater factor than the language would imply. For a period of time during the 1980s and '90's, it was not uncommon for the annual dividend to exceed the total premium at the 20th policy year and beyond. {Milton Jones, CLU, ChFC}

With non-participating policies, unneeded surplus is distributed as dividends to stockholders.

Indeterminate premium

Similar to non-participating, except that the premium may vary year to year.  However, the premium will never exceed the maximum premium guaranteed in the policy. This allows companies to set competitive rates based on current economic conditions.

Variations

Economic
A blending of participating and term life insurance, wherein a part of the dividends is used to purchase additional term insurance. This can generally yield a higher death benefit, at a cost to long term cash value. In some policy years the dividends may be below projections, causing the death benefit in those years to decrease.

Limited pay
Limited pay policies may be either participating or non-par, but instead of paying annual premiums for life, they are only due for a certain number of years, such as 20. The policy may also be set up to be fully paid up at a certain age, such as 65 or 80. The policy itself continues for the life of the insured.  These policies would typically cost more up front, since the insurance company needs to build up sufficient cash value within the policy during the payment years to fund the policy for the remainder of the insured's life. With Participating policies, dividends may be applied to shorten the premium paying period.

Single premium
Single premium whole life insurance, is a type of life insurance policy that provides lifetime coverage and requires only one lump sum initial payment to the insurance company. If not structured properly, these plans can become a modified endowment contract or MEC. These policies typically have fees during early policy years should the policyholder cash it in.

Interest sensitive 
This type is fairly new, and is also known as either "excess interest" or "current assumption" whole life. The policies are a mixture of traditional whole life and universal life. Instead of using dividends to augment guaranteed cash value accumulation, the interest on the policy's cash value varies with current market conditions.  Like whole life, death benefit remains constant for life. Like universal life, the premium payment might vary, but not above the maximum premium guaranteed within the policy.

Requirements 
Whole life insurance typically requires that the owner pay premiums for the life of the policy.  There are some arrangements that let the policy be "paid up",  which means that no further payments are ever required, in as few as 5 years, or with even a single large premium. Typically if the payor doesn't make a large premium payment at the outset of the life insurance contract, then he is not allowed to begin making them later in the contract life. However, some whole life contracts offer a rider to the policy which allows for a one time, or occasional, large additional premium payment to be made as long as a minimal extra payment is made on a regular schedule.  In contrast,  universal life insurance generally allows more flexibility in premium payment.

Guarantees 
The company generally will guarantee that the policy's cash values will increase every year regardless of the performance of the company or its experience with death claims (again compared to universal life insurance and variable universal life insurance which can increase the costs and decrease the cash values of the policy). The dividends can be taken in one of three ways. The policy owner can be given a cheque from the insurance company for the dividends, the dividends can be used to reduce the premium payment, or the dividends can be reinvested back into the policy to increase the death benefit and the cash value at a faster rate. When the dividends paid on a whole life policy are chosen by the policy owner to be reinvested back into the policy, the cash value can increase at a rather substantial rate depending on the performance of the company.

The cash value will grow tax-deferred with compounding interest. Even though the growth is considered "tax-deferred", any loans taken from the policy will be tax-free as long as the policy remains in force. In addition, the death benefit remains tax-free (meaning no income tax and no estate tax). As the cash value increases, the death benefit will also increase and this growth is also non-taxable. The only way tax is ever due on the policy is (1) if the premiums were paid with pre-tax dollars, (2) if cash value is "withdrawn" past basis rather than "borrowed", or (3) if the policy is surrendered. Most whole life policies can be surrendered at any time for the cash value amount, and income taxes will usually only be placed on the gains of the cash account that exceeds the total premium outlay. Thus, many are using whole life insurance policies as a retirement funding vehicle rather than for risk management.

Liquidity
Cash values are considered liquid assets because they are easily accessible at any time, usually with a phone call or fax to the insurance company requesting a "loan" or "withdrawal" from the policy.  Most companies will transfer the money into the policy holder's bank account within a few days.

Cash values are also liquid enough to be used for investment capital, but only if the owner is financially healthy enough to continue making premium payments. (Single premium whole life policies avoid the risk of the insured failing to make premium payments and are liquid enough to be used as collateral. Single premium policies require that the insured pay a one time premium that tends to be lower than the split payments. Because these policies are fully paid at inception, they have no financial risk and are liquid and secure enough to be used as collateral under the insurance clause of collateral assignment.) Cash value access is tax free up to the point of total premiums paid, and the rest may be accessed tax free in the form of policy loans. If the policy lapses, taxes would be due on outstanding loans.  If the insured dies, death benefit is reduced by the amount of any outstanding loan balance.

Internal rates of return for participating policies may be much worse than universal life and interest-sensitive whole life (whose cash values are invested in the money market and bonds) because their cash values are invested in the life insurance company and its general account, which may be in real estate and the stock market. However, universal life policies run a much greater risk, and are actually designed to lapse. Variable universal life insurance may outperform whole life because the owner can direct investments in sub-accounts that may do better. If an owner desires a conservative position for his cash values, par whole life is indicated.

Reported cash values might seem to "disappear" or become "lost" when the death benefit is paid out.  The reason for this is that cash values are considered to be part of the death benefit. The insurance company pays out the cash values with the death benefit because they are inclusive of each other. This is why loans from the cash value are not taxable as long as the policy is in force (because death benefits are not taxable).

See also 
 Life insurance
 Permanent life insurance
 Theory of decreasing responsibility

References

External links

Life insurance